Georges Dubois may refer to:

  (1890–1953), French geologist
 Georges Dubois (gymnast), French Olympic gymnast
 Georges Dubois (hurdler) (died 1934), French Olympic hurdler
  (1896–1971), officer of the Free French forces, Companion of the Liberation
  (1902–1993), Swiss parasitologist
 Georges Dubois (sculptor) (1865–1934), French sculptor
 Georges Dubois (skier) (born 1935), Swiss Olympic cross-country skier
  (1911–1983), Swiss architect